The miscellaneous hazardous materials category encompasses all hazardous materials that do not fit one of the definitions listed in Class 1 through Class 8.

Divisions

The miscellaneous hazardous material is a material that presents a hazard during transportation but which does not meet the definition of any other hazard class. This class includes:

Any material which has an anesthetic, noxious or other similar property which could cause extreme annoyance or discomfort to a flight crew member so as to prevent the correct performance of assigned duties; or
Any material that meets the definition in 49 CFR 171.8 for an elevated temperature material, a hazardous substance, a hazardous waste, or a marine pollutant.

A new sub-class, class 9A, has been in effect since January 1, 2017. This is limited to the labeling of the transport of lithium batteries.

Placards

Compatibility Table

Packing Groups

The packing group of a Class 9 material is as indicated in Column 5 of the 49CFR 172.101 Table.

References

49 CFR 173.140
49 CFR 173.141

Miscellaneous